This article refers to sports broadcasting contracts in Russia. For a list of rights in other countries, see Sports television broadcast contracts.

Football

National tournaments 
 FIFA World Cup, UEFA European Football Championship, UEFA Nations League:
 Qualification. National team: Telesport, Channel One (top matches), Russia 1 (some matches), Match TV, REN TV, other matches: till 2022 Telesport, Match TV, after Okko
 2022 FIFA World Cup: Channel One, Russia 1, Match TV

Club tournaments 
 International tournaments
UEFA Supercup: Match TV
UEFA Champions League: Match TV
UEFA Europa League: Match TV
UEFA Youth League: Match TV
CONMEBOL Libertadores: Match TV
CONMEBOL Sudamericana: Match TV
CONMEBOL Recopa: Match TV
AFC Champions League: TV Start
AFC Cup: TV Start

 Russia
 Russian Super Cup: Channel One, Match Premier, Match TV
 Russian Cup: Match TV, Match Premier 
 Russian Premier League (2018-2022): Russia-24 (highlights), Match TV, Match Premier
 League 1: Match TV, Yandex\KinoPoisk, RuTube
 League 2 Tricolor TV (Futbolnyy)
 Russian Women's Football Championship: Match TV
 Junior Football League: Tricolor TV (Futbolnyy)

 England
 Premier League: till 2022 Okko Sport, after Match TV
 FA Cup: Match TV
 EFL Championship: Football TV
 EFL League One: Football TV
 EFL League Two: Football TV
 EFL Cup: Match TV
 Women: TV Start (All suspended)

 Spain
 Supercopa de España: Megogo
 La Liga: Okko Sport
 La Liga SmartBank: Okko Sport
 Copa del Rey: Megogo

 Germany
 DFL-Supercup: Match TV
 DFB-Pokal: Match TV (suspended) 
 Bundesliga: Match TV
 2. Bundesliga: Match TV

 Italy
 Serie A: Match TV
Coppa Italia: Telesport
Supercoppa Italiana: Telesport

 France
 Ligue 1: Match TV (5 matches, 1st and 2nd pick), Yandex\KinoPoisk and Wink (5 matches) (suspended)
 Netherlands
 Eredivisie: Football TV, Match TV
 Portugal
 Primeira Liga: Match TV
 Greece
 Super League Greece: Match TV (2020/2021)

 Norway
Eliteserien: Eurosport (no commentators)

 Austria
Austrian Football Bundesliga: TV Start

 Belarus
Belarusian Premier League: Match TV (no commentators)

Korea
K League: TV Start

Australia
A-League: YouTube

Basketball
Euroleague: till 2022 Match TV, after Okko Sport
Basketball Champions League: TV Start
Eurocup Basketball: Okko Sport
VTB United League: Match TV, TV Start, World of Basketball
National Basketball Association: Megogo (suspended)
Liga ACB: World of Basketball
Germany: TV Start

Hockey
Kontinental Hockey League: Match TV, KHL TV, territorial channels
Russian Major League: YouTube, Tricolor TV (Hockeynyy)
Junior Hockey League: YouTube, KHL TV, Tricolor TV (Hockeynyy)
American Hockey League: Viasat Sport East
Asia League Ice Hockey: Match TV
National Hockey League: Yandex\KinoPoisk (all matches), Wink (all matches), Match TV (selected matches) (suspended)

Volleyball
CEV Champions League: Match TV, TV Start
CEV Women's Champions League: Match TV, TV Start
CEV Cup: Match TV, TV Start
Women's CEV Cup: Match TV, TV Start
Russian Volleyball Super League: Match TV, TV Start
Russian Women's Volleyball Super League: Match TV, TV Start

Handball
Women's EHF Champions League: Match TV
Women's EHF European League: TV Start
Russian national club tournaments: TV Start (Chekhovskiye Medvedi home matches), Match TV
Germany: TV Start

Futsal
Russian Futsal Super League: Match TV 
UEFA Futsal Cup: Eurosport
FIFA Futsal World Cup: Match TV
UEFA Futsal Championship: Match TV

Baseball
Major League Baseball: Viasat Sport East

Golf
 Masters Tournament: Eurosport

Winter sports
Biathlon World Cup: Match TV, Eurosport
Biathlon World Championships: Channel One, Match TV, Eurosport
FIS Cross-Country World Cup: Channel One (selected races), Eurosport
FIS Ski Jumping World Cup: Eurosport
FIS Nordic World Ski Championships: Match TV, Eurosport
FIS Alpine Ski World Cup: Eurosport
FIS Alpine World Ski Championships: Match TV, Eurosport

Athletics
IAAF World Athletics Championships: Match TV
IAAF European Athletics Championships: Eurosport

Motor Racing
Formula One: Match TV (suspended)
Formula 2: Match TV (suspended)
Formula 3: Match TV (suspended)
Porsche Supercup: Match TV, Eurosport
Moto GP: Motorsport TV
World Rally Championship: Motorsport TV, Match Planeta
Deutsche Tourenwagen Masters: Motorsport TV
IndyCar: Match TV (highlights), Viasat Sport East
ELMS: Motorsport TV
WEC: Motorsport TV, Eurosport
TCR: Motorsport TV
WTCR: Eurosport
Formula E: Eurosport
Superbike: Eurosport

Olympic Games
2016 Summer Olympics: Channel One, Russia 1, Match TV

Tennis 
 French Open: Eurosport
 Australian Open: Eurosport
 Wimbledon: Eurosport
 US Open: Eurosport
 ATP Tour Masters 1000: Eurosport (only Player since March 9)
 ATP Tour 500: Eurosport 
 ATP Tour 250: Eurosport (selected tournaments)
 WTA Tour: Okko (except Kremlin Cup and St. Petersburg Ladies' Trophy)
 Kremlin Cup: Match TV
 St. Petersburg Ladies' Trophy: Match TV
 Davis Cup: Match TV
 Fed Cup: Match TV
 ATP Cup: Match TV

Combat Sports

Boxing 

 Matchroom Boxing: Match TV (sometimes aired the major and PPV events)
 World Boxing Super Series: Match TV
 Dream Boxing: DAZN: October 2022 to October 2025, all fights
 Other fights also aired on Fight Club TV, Telesport.

Kickboxing 
 King of Kings: DAZN: October 2022 to October 2025, all fights

Mixed Martial Arts 

Bushido MMA: DAZN: October 2022 to October 2025, all fights
 Fight Nights Global: Match TV
 M-1 Global: Match TV
 ONE Championship: Telesport
 UFC: Match TV

References

Russia
Television in Russia